This article displays the rosters for the teams competing at the EuroBasket Women 2015. Each team has to submit 12 players.

Group A

Czech Republic

France

Montenegro

Romania

Ukraine

Group B

Belarus

Greece

Italy

Poland

Turkey

Group C

Croatia

Great Britain

Latvia

Russia

Serbia

}

Group D

Hungary

Lithuania

Slovakia

Spain

Sweden

References

External links
Official website

Squads
EuroBasket Women squads